The Poppy Factory is a factory in Richmond, London, England, where remembrance wreaths are made. It was founded in 1922 to offer employment opportunities to wounded soldiers returning from the First World War, creating remembrance poppies and wreaths for the Royal Family and The Royal British Legion’s annual Poppy Appeal.  It is operated by a company that is a registered charity which provides employment support to veterans with health conditions across England and Wales.  The factory's production team continues to make remembrance wreaths by hand today. 

The corresponding organisation in Scotland is Lady Haig's Poppy Factory in Edinburgh, which was established in 1926 and makes approximately five million remembrance poppies each year.

History
Artificial poppies for the first poppy appeal in 1921 had been imported from France by Madame Anna Guérin, but in 1922 the Disabled Society, a charity established in 1920 by Major George Howson MC and Major Jack Cohen, received a grant of £2,000 from the British Legion's Unity Relief Fund to employ disabled ex-service personnel to make remembrance poppies in England. Later that year, Howson wrote to his parents, "I do not think it can be a great success, but it is worth trying. I consider the attempt ought to be made if only to give the disabled their chance."

They set up in a former collar factory on the Old Kent Road in London. Soon the factory was employing 50 disabled veterans.  The factory made a million poppies within two months.

In November 1924, the Prince of Wales (later Edward VIII) visited the Poppy Factory, which made 27 million poppies that year.  Most of the employees were disabled, and by then there was a long waiting list for prospective employees.

The old collar factory eventually proved too small as demand increased, and in 1926 the factory moved to a disused brewery in Petersham Road, Richmond, Surrey. Housing for the workforce and their families was built on adjacent land and in 1932 the present factory was built. The original factory was demolished in 1972.

Since 1928, The Poppy Factory has also organised the annual Field of Remembrance at Westminster Abbey.

Present day

The production team works year-round to create Remembrance wreaths by hand for The Royal British Legion’s Poppy Appeal, as well as special wreaths for the British Royal Family.

Beyond its production work, The Poppy Factory's support helps ex-Forces job seekers to overcome barriers and move towards employment. The charity's employment service launched in 2010 and has grown to make up 90 per cent of The Poppy Factory’s work. 

In November 2016, former chief executive Melanie Waters became the chief executive of Help for Heroes charity. Deirdre Mills was later appointed the new chief executive; she had previously been a Director at the Commonwealth War Graves Commission.

In July 2017, Queen Elizabeth II visited the factory to celebrate the charity’s 90th anniversary.

Lady Haig's Poppy Factory

Lady Haig's Poppy Factory is a charity based in Edinburgh, Scotland to provide employment to disabled veterans. It is an independent charity, but the name Lady Haig's Poppy Factory is a trading name of Poppyscotland of which it is a subsidiary.

Lady Haig's Poppy Factory was founded in March 1926, shortly after the Royal British Legion's factory in London. It was created to serve the demand for Remembrance Day poppies in Scotland.

The factory was created at the suggestion of and by  Dorothy, Countess Haig, wife of Field Marshal Douglas Haig, 1st Earl Haig, who had created the Haig Fund to assist ex-servicemen and which still raises funds through the UK's annual poppy appeal.

It grew from two employees in a former wood-chopping factory in the grounds of Whitefoord House to employ over 100 people by the mid-1930s, with a waiting list of over 300.  In addition to the main task of making poppies, the employees made other goods by hand which were sold at three shops in Edinburgh and by a travelling shop throughout Scotland. The factory moved to its current premises, a former printing works, in 1965. Staffing levels and the range of goods made at the factory gradually declined after the Second World War, and increasing annual deficits were funded by contributions from the Earl Haig Fund Scotland.  In 1998, the factory became an independent charitable company, The Lady Haig Poppy Factory Ltd.

In November 2018 the factory was moved for two years into Redford Barracks while major renovations could be made while also adding a new learning facility.

The factory is operated in partnership with Poppyscotland and, like the Poppy Factory in Richmond, also employs ex-service personnel, all of them disabled. It makes five million remembrance poppies in Edinburgh each year, to a slightly different design with four-lobed petals rather than two for English poppies, and 12,000 wreaths.

Remembrance poppies

See also
 Richmond Brewery Stores

References

External links
 Official website: The Poppy Factory
 The Poppy Factory, BBC Radio 4 and BBC Radio 4 Extra blog
 The Poppy Factory, broadcast on BBC Radio 4 at 11am on 9 November 2011
 The Poppy Factory & Transport for London
 Official website: Poppyscotland 
 Official website: Lady Haig's Poppy Factory

1922 establishments in England
Aftermath of World War I in the United Kingdom
British veterans' organisations
Buildings and structures in the London Borough of Richmond upon Thames
Charities based in Edinburgh
Charities based in London
Organisations based in the London Borough of Richmond upon Thames
Organizations established in 1922
Richmond, London
The Royal British Legion
Tourist attractions in the London Borough of Richmond upon Thames